The 1981 Japan Series was the 32nd edition of Nippon Professional Baseball's postseason championship series. It matched the Central League champion Yomiuri Giants against the Pacific League champion Nippon-Ham Fighters. All games in the series were played at Korakuen Stadium, which served as the home ballpark for both teams during the regular season. This was the first time in Japan Series history that all games were played at the same stadium. The Giants defeated the Fighters in six games for their 16th Japan Series title in team history.

Summary

See also
1981 World Series

References

Japan Series
Hokkaido Nippon-Ham Fighters
 Yomiuri Giants
Japan Series
Japan Series
Japan Series
Japan Series